Young Bill Hickok is a 1940 American Western film directed by Joseph Kane and starring Roy Rogers.

Plot
An agent of an unspecified foreign power (John Miljan) plots to take over California during the confusion of the American Civil War. He uses Morrell and his Overland Raiders to prevent news from reaching the east. The Raiders rustle the stagecoach and Pony Express horses from the various relay stations to cut all lines of communication to and from the east. Bill Hickok is sent out to one of the relay stations in hopes that he would be able to keep the ponies from the raiders. Calamity and Gabby, horse traders for the relay stations, ride up with their Indian helpers just as Bill finishes off the last few Raiders that had attacked his post. Bill has been severely hurt so Calamity and Gabby stick around for a while.

During this time, Bill's old fiancée, Louise Mason, shows up. She wants to make up after their breaking their engagement over her support for the Confederacy and Bil's for the North.  They agree to forget the war; she and Bill are soon planning a wedding. However, Marshal Evans, head of the communication lines, wants Bill to take a shipment of gold through to the east to support the Federal war effort.
 
Bill knows it's too dangerous to actually take it himself, the raiders would be sure to get it, so he sends the gold with Gabby and Calamity while pretending to take it himself. The plan backfires when Louise tells Tower that Bill isn't taking the gold to protect Bill from attack. The Raiders attack Gabby and get away with the gold. Bill gets worried when the Raiders don't attack him so he returns to town to see what happened to Gabby. The Marshal wants to know what went wrong and Bill asks for half an hour to find out. After he leaves, Tower convinces the men that Bill is really at the head of the Raiders and that he was getting away. Gabby overhears their conversation so he rides to warn Bill.

Bill gets away for the time being but is captured when he returns to town to search Tower's office. Gabby helps him escape and they see Tower escaping with the gold and the Raiders. Riding back to the posse that pursued them, Bill convinces Marshal to follow them. With Tower and the Raiders locked up and the Civil War ended, Bill and Louise finally get married.

Cast
Roy Rogers as "Wild" Bill Hickok
George 'Gabby' Hayes as "Gabby" Whitaker
Julie Bishop as Louise Mason
John Miljan as Nicholas Tower
Sally Payne as Miss "Calamity" Jane Canary
 Archie Twitchell  as Phillip
Monte Blue as Marshal Evans
Hal Taliaferro as 	Morrell
Ethel Wales as Mrs. Stout
Jack Ingram as Henchman Red Burke
Monte Montague as Charlie Majors

Soundtrack 
 "Polly Wolly Doodle"
 Roy Rogers – "When the Shadows Fall Across the Rockies" (written by Peter Tinturin)
 Sally Payne and George "Gabby" Hayes – "Up and Down the Prairie" (written by Peter Tinturin)
 Roy Rogers – "A Cowboy Wedding" (written by Mila Sweet and Nat Vincent)
 Sally Payne – "Tamales" (written by Eddie Cherkose and Raoul Kraushaar)
 Roy Rogers – "I'll Keep on Singin' a Song"

External links 
 Young Bill Hickok on YouTube
 
 

1940 films
1940s English-language films
American black-and-white films
Republic Pictures films
1940 Western (genre) films
American Civil War films
Cultural depictions of Wild Bill Hickok
Cultural depictions of Calamity Jane
American Western (genre) films
Films scored by Raoul Kraushaar
Films directed by Joseph Kane
1940s American films